Shah Mosque may refer to:

 Tomb of Artaxerxes I, The Tomb is  Artaxerxes I.

 Tomb of Darius the Great, The Tomb is Darius the Great.
 Tomb of Darius II, The Tomb is Darius II.
 Tomb of Xerxes I, The Tomb is Xerxes I.